My darling YOU! is a Swedish indie pop duo from Göteborg and Alingsås, composed of Klas Hermansson and Christopher Johansson.  They are currently under Swedish independent record label Luxury, with whom they have released five albums to date.

Discography
 My darling YOU!, 2004
 Moving out of your house and into another, 2004
 The winter will take us all., 2006
 16 major problems, 2006
 My heart beats too fast for our friendship to last, 2006
 I will exclude you with my body language, 2007
 Techno music for the indiepop haters, 2008
 The Dancefloor Remakes, 2009
 A.K. ART, 2009
 Saying things you don't want to hear, 2009
 Let the good times roll, 2010
 Sorry, 2011
 Thanks For Letting Me Stay, 2019
 A Dream Come True, 2020

External links
 Official website

Swedish indie pop groups